The Oscar Anderson House Museum is a historical museum at 420 M Street in downtown Anchorage in the U.S. state of Alaska.  Located in Elderberry Park, the structure was built in 1915 by early Anchorage resident Oscar Anderson.  Anderson claimed to be the 18th person to set foot on what is now Anchorage.  The structure was the first wood-frame house in Anchorage, and was occupied by Anderson until his death in 1974.  The house was completely restored to a 1915 appearance between 1978 and 1982, and is now open as a historic house museum.

It was listed on the National Register of Historic Places in 1978.

See also
National Register of Historic Places listings in Anchorage, Alaska

References

External links
 Oscar Anderson House Museum - Alaska Association for Historic Preservation

Historic house museums in Alaska
Houses completed in 1915
Houses on the National Register of Historic Places in Alaska
Museums in Anchorage, Alaska
Houses in Anchorage, Alaska
Buildings and structures on the National Register of Historic Places in Anchorage, Alaska